KKSO (1390 kHz) was a commercial AM radio station in Des Moines, Iowa. The station was owned by Barnstable Broadcasting, and was supplanted by its expanded band successor, KBGG 1700 AM, in 2001.

History
KKSO signed on in 1947 as KCBC.  The station was owned by Capital City Broadcasting Company and was a network affiliate of the Mutual Broadcasting System. KCBC broadcast on 1390 kilocycles with a 1,000 watt directional antenna day and night.

In 1949, an FM station was launched on 94.1 MHz, as KCBC-FM.  That station went off the air in 1953, and the license was deleted by the Federal Communications Commission (FCC).

In 1983, KCBC became KMRY, mostly simulcasting the country music of co-owned KJJY. In 1990, it became KKSO (in reference to the heritage KSO call sign vacated the year prior).

Expanded Band assignment and deletion

On March 17, 1997, the Federal Communications Commission (FCC) announced that eighty-eight stations had been given permission to move to newly available "Expanded Band" transmitting frequencies, ranging from 1610 to 1700 kHz, with KKSO authorized to move from 1390 to 1700 kHz.

A construction permit for the expanded band station was assigned the call letters KBGG on November 12, 1997. The FCC's initial policy was that both the original station and its expanded band counterpart could operate simultaneously for up to five years, after which owners would have to turn in one of the two licenses, depending on whether they preferred the new assignment or elected to remain on the original frequency. It was ultimately decided to transfer full operations to the expanded band station, and on February 2, 2001, the license for KKSO was cancelled.

References

External links
Station Search Details: DKKSO (Facility ID: 22888)
FCC History Cards for KKSO (covering 1944-1980 as KCBC)

Radio stations established in 1947
1947 establishments in Iowa
Radio stations disestablished in 2001
2001 disestablishments in Iowa
Radio stations in Des Moines, Iowa
Defunct radio stations in the United States
Defunct mass media in Iowa